Busy may refer to:

Places
 Busy, Doubs, a commune in France
 Busy, Kentucky

People
 Everett M. "Busy" Arnold (1899–1974), American comic books entrepreneur
 Busy Bee Starski (born 1962), American rapper
 Busy P, the stage name of the French DJ Pedro Winter
 Busy Philipps (born 1979), American film actress

Arts, entertainment, and media

Fictional characters
 Little Miss Busy, a Little Miss character
 Mr. Busy, a character in the Mr. Men series and the titular character of the book Mr. Busy

Music
 "Busy" (Lyfe Jennings song), 2010
 "Busy" (Olly Murs song), 2011
 "Busy", a 1998 song by Grinspoon
 "Busy", a song by Jawbreaker
 "Busy", a 2000 song by K's Choice

See also
 Business
 Busy signal (disambiguation)
 Bussy (disambiguation)